Edward McGinty (born 5 August 1999) is a professional footballer who plays for English club Oxford United, as a goalkeeper. Born in Scotland, he represented the Republic of Ireland at youth international level.

Club career
Born in Motherwell, McGinty played youth football in his native Scotland for Celtic and Hibernian before joining Irish club Sligo Rovers in 2016. 

He moved to English club Oxford United in July 2022 on a three-year contract. He made his debut for Oxford on 9 August 2022 in an EFL Cup win over Championship side Swansea City, making a crucial save in the penalty shootout to help his side to the win. He made his Football League debut in a 3–0 defeat on 26 December 2022 against Ipswich Town.

International career
McGinty was an Irish youth international.  On 16 November 2020, he made his Ireland under-21 debut against Iceland in the Under-21 European Championship qualifier, but they were beaten 2–1.

References

1999 births
Living people
Scottish footballers
Republic of Ireland association footballers
Celtic F.C. players
Hibernian F.C. players
Sligo Rovers F.C. players
Oxford United F.C. players
League of Ireland players
Association football goalkeepers
English Football League players
Republic of Ireland under-21 international footballers
Footballers from Motherwell
Republic of Ireland youth international footballers